European route E 641 is a secondary E-road in Austria and Germany.

It starts at Wörgl, Austria, where it is connected with European route E 45 and E 60 (Austrian autobahn A12).
In Austria, it passes through Sankt Johann in Tirol and Lofer as federal highway B178
In Germany, it passes through Bad Reichenhall as federal highway B 21
The route then enters Austria again, ending in Salzburg, where it is connected with E 52, E 55 and E 60.

Route 
 
 E45, E60 Wörgl
 Sankt Johann in Tirol
 Lofer
 
 Bad Reichenhall
 
 E55, E60, E52 Salzburg

External links 
 UN Economic Commission for Europe: Overall Map of E-road Network (2007)
International E-road network

699641
E641
641
E641